Even Angels Cast Shadows is the fifth studio album by English producer Robert Haigh released under his Omni Trio moniker. The album was released on compact disc as well as a limited edition 4-disc vinyl boxset through Moving Shadow, his last full-length for the label. The LP boxset edition includes a track list that differs from the CD edition, omitting the tracks "A Little Rain Must Fall" and "Nu Birth (Re-Lick)". Each side of the LP edition includes a single track. The track "First Contact" was featured in the video game Grand Theft Auto III.

Track listing

Release history

References

External links
 

2001 albums
Rob Haigh albums